Informa plc is a British publishing, business intelligence, and exhibitions group based in London, England. It is listed on the London Stock Exchange and is a constituent of the FTSE 100 Index.

It has offices in 43 countries and around 11,000 employees. Informa owns numerous brands including CRC Press, Fan Expo HQ, Game Developers Conference, Lloyd's List (London Press Lloyd), Routledge, and Taylor & Francis.

Informa acquired UBM in June 2018 as part of its strategy to expand in North America and Asia.

History
Informa itself was created in 1998 by the merger of IBC Group plc and LLP Group plc. Since then Informa has expanded considerably, including a 2004 merger with the publishing company Taylor & Francis and a 2005 acquisition of IIR Holdings, a human capital development company, for £768 million. In October 2006, the company was approached by Springer Science and Business Media in a takeover bid, but in early November the Informa board rejected the 630p per share offer as too low.

In early 2007, chairman Richard Hooper announced his retirement in May and, after consulting with major shareholders, the company moved chief executive Peter Rigby to chairman, and managing director David Gilbertson to Rigby's former post. Informa explained Rigby's move by the need to maintain management stability, although it generated some controversy because it did not follow the advice of the UK's Combined Code on Corporate Governance.

On 8 June 2008, The Sunday Telegraph revealed that United Business Media (UBM) had proposed a merger with Informa to create a media group worth over £3 billion. The talks were confirmed by Informa in a press release that same day, but described as "preliminary". Previously on 13 May The Times had reported that the Carlyle Group and Apax Partners were considering bidding for the company. On 17 June talks with UBM ended because of the rapid rise in Informa's stock price after the public disclosure of the potential merger. On 26 June a private equity consortium consisting of Providence Equity Partners, the Carlyle Group and Hellman & Friedman proposed a takeover bid offering 506 pence per share.

In May 2009 the company announced that it would restructure its business to be incorporated in Jersey but tax resident in Switzerland.

The discontinued domain Informaworld provided subscribers with more than half a million journal articles and 13,000 e-books from all its imprints. In June 2011 the journals and e-books transferred to a new website, Taylor & Francis Online. Abstracting and indexing databases and bibliographic databases were to move from Informaworld to Taylor & Francis Online at a later date.

In July 2013, the company announced that Peter Rigby would retire at the end of 2013 to be replaced as CEO by Stephen Carter. Also in 2013, Informa acquired the Canadian company Hobby Star Marketing, who ran the Fan Expo Canada and Toronto Comicon comic book conventions. Informa has since acquired other conventions and placed them under the auspices of their Fan Expo HQ brand, including Dallas Comic Con and MegaCon.

In December 2013, Informa acquired the assets of Elsevier Business Intelligence (EBI) from Reed Elsevier. The EBI business unit includes such publications as The Pink Sheet, The Gray Sheet, IN VIVO, Start-Up, and the Strategic Transactions database along with a series of notable conferences. The EBI assets combined with Scrip, Datamonitor and several other publications formed the newly created Pharma Intelligence division of Informa Business Information.

In January 2014, Carter became CEO of Informa plc. In September 2017, Informa announced that it would be acquiring Dove Medical Press.

In January 2018, Informa announced its intent to acquire UBM plc. The transaction was completed in June 2018.

In 2019, Informa sold the former UBM Life Sciences to MJH Associates. Later in 2019, Informa traded it Agriculture Intelligence unit to IHS Markit in exchange for most of IHS Markit's Technology, Media and Telecoms division. Also in 2019, Informa sold the former Penton design & engineering, manufacturing, energy, buildings, and commercial vehicle divisions, and the former UBM Automotive, to Endeavor Business Media.

In February 2020, Informa launched Omdia by consolidated its portfolio of market analyst companies, Ovum Ltd, Heavy Reading, Tractica, and the majority of IHS Markit's technology, media and telecommunications research business, into a unified brand. The combined research offering includes more than 400 analysts and consultants covering 150 technology markets. Collectively, Omdia issues over 3,000 research reports annually.

In February 2022, Informa sold its Informa Pharma Intelligence unit to investment fund, Warburg Pincus for $2.6 billion.
 It also sold Lloyd's List and EPFR to Montagu Private Equity in 2022.

Operations
Informa is organized into four operating divisions: Informa Connect, Informa Markets, Informa Tech, and Taylor & Francis.

In June 2021, John Rishton was appointed as chairman, replacing Derek Mapp.

Brands
Informa owns numerous brands including CRC Press, Fan Expo HQ, Game Developers Conference, Lloyd's List (London Press Lloyd), Routledge, and Taylor & Francis. Retired and consolidated brands include Institute for International Research, Ovum Ltd, Penton, The Public Ledger, and UBM.

Informa Connect
The Bride Show
Fan Expo
Calgary Comic and Entertainment Expo
Edmonton Comic and Entertainment Expo
Fan Expo Boston
Fan Expo Canada (Toronto)
Toronto Comicon
Fan Expo Chicago
Fan Expo Cleveland
Fan Expo Dallas
Dallas Fan Festival
Fan Expo Denver
Fan Expo New Orleans
Fan Expo San Francisco
Fan Expo St. Louis
Fan Expo Philadelphia
Fan Expo Portland
Fan Expo Vancouver
MegaCon
 HRSE 
 Lloyd's Maritime Academy
 MedTech Summit
 Middle East Film and Comic Con
 Nation's Restaurant News
 TMRE

Informa Markets
 Arab Health
 Aviation Week Network
 CAPA - Centre for Aviation
 Coterie
 Farm Progress
 Fort Lauderdale International Boat Show
 Inside Self Storage
 Magic
 Monaco Yacht Show
 Project
 Qualifi
 Routes
 World of Concrete

Informa Tech
 Black Hat Briefings
 Game Developer
 Game Developers Conference
 InformationWeek
 Light Reading
 London Tech Week
 The AI Summit
 Omdia
 Ward's

Taylor & Francis
 CRC Press
 Dove Medical Press
 Routledge

References

External links 
 

 
Academic publishing companies
Technology websites
Publishing companies established in 1998
Companies listed on the London Stock Exchange
1998 establishments in England
Event management companies of the United Kingdom
Multinational companies headquartered in England